The surname Chernik, also Chernick, Czernik may refer to:

Alison Chernick, American writer/director and filmmaker
Edward Czernik (b. 1940), Polish athlete
Jonas Chernick (b. 1973), Canadian actor and screenwriter
Oldřich Černík (1921–1994), Czechoslovakian Prime Minister
Syarhey Chernik (b. 1988), Belarusian footballer

See also 
Ruda-Czernik, village in Poland

Slavic-language surnames
Jewish surnames